Chillar is a village in Rewari district, Haryana, India, formerly in Gurgaon Division. Its postal head office is at Khalilpur. It is surrounded by Pataudi Tehsil to the east, Jatusana Tehsil to the west, Farrukh Nagar Tehsil to the north, and Bawal Tehsil to the south.

Demographics of 2011
As of 2011 India census, Chillar had a population of 3089 in 609 households. Males (1597) constitute 51.69%  of the population and females (1492) 48.3%. Chillar has an average literacy (2189) rate of 70.86%, lower than the national average of 74%: male literacy (1272) is 58.1%, and female literacy (917) is 41.89% of total literates (2189). In Chillar, Rewari, 12.91% of the population is under 6 years of age (399).

See also
Hondh-Chillar massacre

References

Villages in Rewari district